Heteropsammia is a genus of apozooxanthellate corals that belong to the family Dendrophylliidae.

Anatomy 
These corals consist of free-living, single polyps, of a diameter of around 2.5 cm. They form a symbiotic relationship with a sipunculid worm, Aspidosiphon corallicola. The worm lives in a cavity situated on the under surface of the coral and it pulls the polip over sandy substrates. They also present a facultative symbiotic relationship with  zooxanthellae of the Symbiodinium genus, as this link has been observed at shallow waters (under 40 m), but not at greater depths (where the corals live without the algae). Heteropsammia corals can sometimes establish symbiotic relationships with other marine species, such as hermit crabs, that live in the cavity where the endosymbiotic Sipunculid worm is usually located.

Nutrition 
Heteropsammia corals (of the species Heteropsammia cochlea) have been observed ingesting salps in Leuk Bay, Koh Tao, Gulf of Thailand, thanks to their large gape, as the salps were larger than the corals mouth opening.

Species
The following species are listed in the World Register of Marine Species (WoRMS):

 Heteropsammia cochlea Spengler, 1781
 Heteropsammia eupsammides Gray, 1849
 Heteropsammia moretonensis Wells, 1964

Notes and references 

Dendrophylliidae
Cnidarians of the Indian Ocean
Cnidarians of the Pacific Ocean
Cnidarian genera